Nelson Suburbs FC is a football club in Nelson, New Zealand. They compete in the Mainland Premier League.

They have won the Mainland Premier League three times. Nelson Suburbs FC has strong ties with the region's most successful football school Nelson College.

Nelson Suburbs FC manages teams for Seniors, Women, Juniors/Youth (ages 9 to 19), Fun Football (ages 7 to 8)  and First Kicks (ages 4 to 6).

Club history

In 1978 Nelson Suburbs FC joined Central League where it participated for 8 years until 1985.

In 1996 Nelson Suburbs FC entered the National League.

In 1999 Nelson Suburbs FC entered the new South Island league.

In 2000, Nelson Suburbs FC entered the Mainland Premier League. It won the competition in 2004, 2005 and 2008.

In 2018, Nelson Suburbs FC entered the newly formed Southern Football League, comprising the five best finishers in the Mainland Premier League and the three best finishers in the Southern Premier League.

In 2019, Nelson Suburbs FC won the Southern Football League by 1 point over Mainland Premier League rivals Cashmere Technical Football Club.

In 2020, Nelson Suburbs FC launched the Nelson Suburbs Football Academy. 

In national competition, Nelson Suburbs have yet to reach the final of the Chatham Cup; having reached the semi-finals in 2008 and 2018. Both campaigns ended with loses to eventual champions East Coast Bays 2–1 in 2008 and Birkenhead United 2–0 in 2018. The team spent one season in the national league in 2000, finishing seventh out of ten teams but withdrawing from the 2001 league for financial reasons.

References

External links
Nelson Suburbs Home

Association football clubs in New Zealand
Sport in Nelson, New Zealand
1967 establishments in New Zealand